The men's 4 x 400 metres relay at the 2013 World Championships in Athletics was held at the Luzhniki Stadium on 15–16 August.

The United States dominated, taking the lead from the start and never looking back, but not with the overwhelming show of force of some past championships.  David Verburg passed first to silver medalist Tony McQuay who broke first and stayed out of traffic.  Behind them, the race was quite competitive, with Russia's Maksim Dyldin closing the first lap in a rush then Lev Mosin running a strong curve to close off the break.  Great Britain's Martyn Rooney had to go wide around the turn to pass the Russians, only to be passed himself by Belgium's Kevin Borlée.  After Jonathan had led off, he passed to a third Borlée, Dylan.  The team of brothers pulled to within two meters of the leading Americans with 500 meters to go, but then the gap widened to five meters.  With gold medalist LaShawn Merritt pulling away, Russia's Vladimir Krasnov quickly passed Belgium's Will Oyowe at the handoff.  Down the backstretch Jamaica's Javon Francis passed Great Britain, Belgium and Russia to move into second.  Krasnov came back but Francis held him off at the line to take silver.

Records
Prior to the competition, the records were as follows:

Qualification standards

Schedule

Results

Heats
Qualification: First 2 of each heat (Q) plus the 2 fastest times (q) advanced to the final.

Final
The final was started at 21:30.

References

External links
4x 400 metres relay results at IAAF website

4 x 400 metres relay
Relays at the World Athletics Championships